Brigadier Mark Andrew Brewer,  is a senior Australian Army officer and a former Commandant of Royal Military College, Duntroon, the officer training school of the Australian Army. He held this position from 2016 to 2017. He graduated from Duntroon in 1987.

Brewer has been awarded the Conspicuous Service Cross (CSC) twice. He received the CSC in the 2006 Queen's Birthday Honours, and received a Bar for it in the 2011 Australia Day Honours. He was appointed a Member of the Order of Australia in the 2018 Australia Day Honours.

References

Australian brigadiers
Australian military personnel of the War in Afghanistan (2001–2021)
Living people
Members of the Order of Australia
Recipients of the Conspicuous Service Cross (Australia)
Royal Military College, Duntroon graduates
Year of birth missing (living people)